Duttaphrynus, named after Sushil Kumar Dutta, is a genus of true toads endemic to southwestern and southern China (including Hainan), Taiwan and throughout southern Asia from northern Pakistan and Nepal through India and Bangladesh to Sri Lanka, Andaman Island, Sumatra, Java, Borneo and Bali.

Description
These toads are characterized by heads with prominent, bony ridges, such as a canthal, a preorbital, a supraorbital, a postorbital ridge and a short orbitotympanic ridge. The snout is short and blunt; the interorbital space is  broader than the upper eyelid; the tympanum is very small, not half the diameter of eye, and generally indistinct. The first finger of these toads extends beyond the second; the toes are half webbed with single subarticular tubercles, two moderate metatarsal tubercles, and no tarsal fold. The tarsometatarsal articulation reaches the eye, or between the eye and the tip of the snout. The upper surface features are irregular and distinctly porous warts with prominent parotoids. These are elliptical and two, or two and a half, times as long as they are broad. The toads are brown above and yellow beneath, marbled with brown. Males have a subgular vocal sac and are typically 3 in long.

This genus was previously assigned to the Bufo melanostictus group. Frost et al. suggested that species of the genus Duttaphrynus are only distantly related to other Asiatic bufonids and consequently moved these species to a separate genus in 2006.

Species

References

External links
 . 2007. Amphibian Species of the World: an Online Reference. Version 5.1 (10 October 2007). Duttaphrynus. Electronic Database accessible at https://web.archive.org/web/20071024033938/http://research.amnh.org/herpetology/amphibia/index.php. American Museum of Natural History, New York, USA. (Accessed: May 2, 2008).

 
Amphibians of Asia
Amphibian genera